Bursuq may refer to:

Bursuq the Elder (d. 1097), Seljuk military leader
Bursuq II (d. 1116/7), emir of Hamadan